Dominican Red Cross (CRD) was founded in 1927. Activities performed include the distribution of aid following disasters; education on vector borne disease avoidance (inc. Zika Virus and Dengue Virus); first aid training; and sanitation improvement. Community engagement is strongly pushed, and routine work consists of door to door visits and community meetings, to raise awareness of issues and coping strategies.

References

External links
Official Website

Red Cross and Red Crescent national societies
Organizations established in 1927
Medical and health organizations based in the Dominican Republic